Chanda Jayanth Jog is an Indian astrophysicist working at the Indian Institute of Science, Bangalore. Her study specializes in Galactic Dynamics, Interacting & Star Burst Galaxies and Interstellar Molecular Clouds. She has published around 85 articles surrounding galaxies and galactic dynamics.

Early life
Dr Chanda Jayanth Jog spent a part of her childhood at Kalwe in Maharashtra. Her father was an Electrical Engineer.

Career
After her Doctoral Studies from Stony Brook University. She worked as a post doctoral fellow at Princeton and as professor in Virginia. She returned to India in 1987, where she continued her work at Indian Institute of Science. 
Her work has been in the area of star-gas instabilities and vertical-disk dynamics in galaxies, triggering of starbursts by shock compression of gas, lopsided galaxies, and the dynamics of interacting galaxies.

Awards and honours 
 Prof. S. K. Chatterjee Award of IISc (2012)
 Elected Fellow of the National Academy of Sciences, Allahabad (2011)
 Elected Fellow of the Indian Academy of Sciences, Bangalore (2007)

References

Indian women physicists
Living people
Articles created or expanded during Women's History Month (India) - 2015
1954 births
University of Mumbai alumni
Fellows of the Indian Academy of Sciences
Fellows of The National Academy of Sciences, India
Scientists from Bangalore
Indian astrophysicists
Academic staff of the Indian Institute of Science
20th-century Indian physicists
20th-century Indian women scientists